Pano Koutrafas is a small village in the Nicosia District of Cyprus, 3 km south of Kato Koutrafas. Before 1974,  the village was inhabited almost exclusively by Turkish Cypriots.  Today the village is largely uninhabited.

References

Communities in Nicosia District